Akyazı is a village in the Düzce District of Düzce Province in Turkey. Its population is 403 (2022). The Düzce Fault, a part of the North Anatolian Fault that stretches 70 kilometers on which the 1999 Düzce earthquake happened, goes below the village.

References

Villages in Düzce District